The floating battery Duque de Tetuán was an ironclad warship, a low-freeboard vessel similar in design to a monitor, of the Spanish Navy, and was constructed during the Third Carlist War to provide coastal defense and fire support for troops ashore. Completed after the end of the conflict for which it was designed, the ship was assigned to the defense of Ferrol. It remained in this duty, though briefly decommissioned in 1897, until it was decommissioned and scrapped in 1900.

Design
Some of the armor plate used in the construction of Duque de Tetuán came from the earlier armoured frigate Tetuan, which had burned under suspicious circumstances during the Cantonist rebellion at Cartagena.

Armament consisted of a single  cannon, and four  rifled cannon. The construction of Duque de Tetuán took place at Cartagena, and the incomplete vessel was among the vessels captured by the rebel forces when they seized the city.

Career
Despite the urgent need for such a vessel to provide fire support in the government's campaign against the Carlists, Duque de Tetuán was not completed in time to participate in the war. Of little use in any offensive role as a result of its design, it was considered "a failure as a ship of war", and was assigned to the defense of the Armada base at Ferrol. Duque de Tetuán served in this unglamorous role, seeing no action, for the duration of its career.

Considered a third-rate ship by the close of the 19th century, Duque de Tetuán was decommissioned and struck from the official strength of the Armada by 1897. However, in 1898, the outbreak of the Spanish–American War led to its being recommissioned, to once more defend Ferrol against attack, the ship being fitted with controls for the electric mines that had been laid to protect the base.

After the end of the war, Duque de Tetuán was again decommissioned, and was sold for scrap in 1900.

Citations

Bibliography
 
 
 
 
 
 

Gunboats of the Spanish Navy
Ships built in Ferrol, Spain
Spanish–American War gunboats of Spain
Ironclad warships of the Spanish Navy